Gérard Duquet (17 April 1909 – 26 January 1986) was a Liberal party member of the House of Commons of Canada. He was born in Montmorency, Quebec and became a business agent, businessman and manager by career.

He represented the Quebec East electoral district which he first won in the 1965 federal election. The riding once been held by Prime Ministers Wilfrid Laurier and Louis St. Laurent; Duquet was the first Liberal to win it since St. Laurent's retirement in 1958. since He won re-election in the 1968, 1972, 1974, 1979 and 1980 federal elections. Duquet served six consecutive terms from the 27th through the 32nd Canadian Parliaments.

Duquet was defeated in the 1984 federal election by Marcel Tremblay of the Progressive Conservative party.

Electoral record

External links
 

1909 births
1986 deaths
Liberal Party of Canada MPs
Members of the House of Commons of Canada from Quebec
Politicians from Quebec City
French Quebecers